V. Balakrishnan (31 December 1939 – 8 August 2020) was an Indian politician and Member of the Legislative Assembly. He was elected to the Tamil Nadu legislative assembly as an Anna Dravida Munnetra Kazhagam candidate from Sivakasi constituency in 1980 and 1984 elections.

References

All India Anna Dravida Munnetra Kazhagam politicians
1939 births
2020 deaths
Tamil Nadu MLAs 1985–1989